Paunović (Serbian Cyrillic: Пауновић) is a Serbian surname derived from the masculine given name Paun. It may refer to:

Aleks Paunovic, Canadian actor
Blagoje Paunović (1947–2014), footballer and manager
Ivan Paunović (born 1986), football midfielder
Marko Paunović (born 1988), football defender
Milenko Paunović (1889–1924), composer and writer
Nikola Paunović (born 1985), singer
Rodoljub Paunović (born 1985), footballer
Sava Paunović (born 1947), footballer
Veljko Paunović (born 1977), footballer

Serbian surnames
Croatian surnames